Tamasha Theatre Company is a British theatre company founded in 1989 by director Kristine Landon-Smith and actor-writer Sudha Bhuchar. Tamasha is an Indian word meaning "spectacle". The company has brought contemporary Asian-influenced drama to the British stage, mixing naturalism with humour, and succeeding in attracting large Asian audiences. 

Tamasha's first production was a theatrical adaptation of Mulk Raj Anand's novel Untouchable. Untouchable was performed in both Hindi and English, with action taking place around a large Indian village created within Riverside Studios. The company's second play adapted another novel, House of the Sun by Meira Chand. The stage set for House of the Sun depicted a large block of flats, including an on-stage working lift. The overall effect was "a sort of Asian take on the Australian soap opera Neighbours, dealing with families in a block of flats in modern-day Bombay".

For six years the company toured small-scale UK venues with one production a year. However, the award-winning 1996 comedy East is East ensured them wider national attention. Tainted Dawn (1997), examining the effects of the partition of India on everyday people, played at the Edinburgh International Festival. In 1998 they created Fourteen Songs, Two Weddings and a Funeral, a Bollywood-inspired musical. The show won the 1998 BBC Asia Award for Achievement in the Arts, and the 1999 Barclays Theatre Award for Best Musical. By the time of Balti Kings (1999–2000), a comedy set in a Balti restaurant, the company was playing larger venues nationally.

Among the many well-known British Asian artists to have worked with the company are actors Parminder Nagra, Jimi Mistry, Nina Wadia, Chris Bisson, Ameet Chana, Nabil Elouahabi, Ila Arun and Zohra Sehgal; writers Ayub Khan-Din, Abhijat Joshi and Deepak Verma; and composers Shri and Nitin Sawhney.

Since 2002, the company has run Tamasha Developing Artists – a professional development programme for emerging and established writers, directors, designers and performers.

Productions 
1989: Untouchable, adapted by Sudha Bhuchar and Kristine Landon-Smith from the novel of the same title by Mulk Raj Anand
1991: House of the Sun, adapted by Sudha Bhuchar and Kristine Landon-Smith from Meira Chand’s novel
1992: Women of the Dust by Ruth Carter
1994: A Shaft of Sunlight by Abhijat Joshi
1995: A Yearning, adapted from Federico García Lorca’s Yerma by Ruth Carter
1996: East is East by Ayub Khan-Din
1997: A Tainted Dawn by Sudha Bhuchar and Kristine Landon-Smith
1998: Fourteen Songs, Two Weddings and a Funeral, adapted from the film Hum Aapke Hain Koun..! by Kristine Landon-Smith and Sudha Bhuchar
1999: Balti Kings by Sudha Bhuchar and Shaheen Khan
2001: Ghostdancing by Deepak Verma, based on Émile Zola's Thérèse Raquin
2002: Ryman and the Sheikh by Sudha Bhuchar, Kristine Landon-Smith, Chris Ryman, Rehan Sheikh and Richard Vranch
2003: All I Want is a British Passport by Nadim Sawahla
2003: Strictly Dandia by Sudha Bhuchar and Kristine Landon-Smith
2005: The Trouble with Asian Men, created by Sudha Bhuchar, Kristine Landon-Smith and Louise Wallinger
2006: A Fine Balance, adapted by Sudha Bhuchar and Kristine Landon-Smith from the novel by Rohinton Mistry
2006: Child of the Divide by Sudha Bhuchar
2008: Lyrical MC by Sita Brahmachari
2008: Sweet Cider by Em Hussain
2009: Wuthering Heights by Deepak Verma; music by Sheema Mukherjee and Felix Cross; lyrics by Felix Cross
2010: The House of Bilquis Bibi by Sudha Bhuchar

References

External links 
Tamasha Theatre Company website
"Tamasha theatre company turns 21", The Guardian, 26 July 2010.

Theatre companies in the United Kingdom
Theatre companies in London
Arts organizations established in 1989
Asian-British culture